1509 Esclangona, provisional designation , is a rare-type Hungaria asteroid and binary system from the inner regions of the asteroid belt, approximately 8 kilometers in diameter. It is named after French astronomer Ernest Esclangon.

Discoveries 

Esclangona was discovered on 21 December 1938, by French astronomer André Patry at Nice Observatory. The body's observation arc begins with its official discovery observation as no precoveries were taken, and no prior identifications were made. On 13 February 2003, a minor-planet moon in orbit of Esclangona was discovered by astronomers at ESO's Very Large Telescope (UT4) on Cerro Paranal in Chile.

Orbit and classification 

Esclangona is a member of the Hungaria family, which form the innermost concentration of asteroids in the Solar System. It orbits the Sun in the inner main-belt at a distance of 1.8–1.9 AU once every 2 years and 7 months (931 days). Its orbit has an eccentricity of 0.03 and an inclination of 22° with respect to the ecliptic.

Binary system 

Esclangona has a small moon, provisionally named , which measures 4 kilometers in diameter, and orbits 140 kilometers from its parent. This wide separation relative to the pair's size is rather unusual and it is believed that both Esclangona and its moon are ejecta from an asteroidal collision in the past that left the scene as a co-orbiting pair; a similar pairing is 3749 Balam and its moon.

Physical characteristics 

In the Tholen taxonomy, Esclangona is a common stony S-type asteroid. It has since been characterized as a rare K-type asteroid by polarimetric observations.

Rotation period 

Diameter and albedo 

According to the surveys carried out by the Infrared Astronomical Satellite IRAS, the Japanese Akari satellite, and NASA's Wide-field Infrared Survey Explorer with its subsequent NEOWISE mission, Esclangona measures between 6.83 and 9.87 kilometers in diameter and its surface has an albedo between 0.107 and 0.41. The Collaborative Asteroid Lightcurve Link derives an albedo of 0.2041 and a diameter of 8.18 kilometers with an absolute magnitude of 12.858.

Naming 

This minor planet was named after French astronomer Ernest Esclangon (1876–1954), was a director of the Paris Observatory and president of the International Astronomical Union. Naming citation was first mentioned in The Names of the Minor Planets by Paul Herget in 1955.

Notes

References

External links 
 Asteroids with Satellites, Robert Johnston, johnstonsarchive.net
 Asteroid Lightcurve Database (LCDB), query form (info )
 Dictionary of Minor Planet Names, Google books
 Asteroids and comets rotation curves, CdR – Observatoire de Genève, Raoul Behrend
 Discovery Circumstances: Numbered Minor Planets (1)-(5000) – Minor Planet Center
 
 

001509
Discoveries by André Patry
Named minor planets
001509
001509
19381221